Euchromius erum is a species of moth in the family Crambidae. It is found in Ethiopia and Kenya.

The length of the forewings is about 14 mm. The ground colour of the forewings is creamy white, densely suffused with ochreous to dark brown scales. The hindwings are light brown with a darkly bordered termen. Adults have been recorded in January, February, March and the beginning of April.

References

Moths described in 1988
Crambinae
Moths of Africa